Princess Nejla bint Asem (born 9 May 1988) is the daughter of Prince Asem bin Nayef and Princess Sana Asem. Princess Nejla bint Asem established a business as a jewellery designer.

Siblings

Siblings 

 Prince Nayef ben Asem (born 22 January 1998)
 Princess Salha bint Asem (born 14 June 1987)

Half-Siblings 

 Princess Yasmeen bint Asem (born 30 June 1975)
 Princess Sara bint Asem (born 12 August 1978)
 Princess Nour bint Asem (born 6 October 1982)

Marriage
On October 23 of 2014, Princess Nejla married Nasser Osama Talhouni.

References 

1988 births
People from Amman
House of Hashim
Living people
Jordanian princesses
Alumni of Middlesex University
Alumni of Goldsmiths, University of London
People educated at Amman Baccalaureate School